The 2016 Gosport Borough Council election took place on 5 May 2016 to elect members of Gosport Borough Council in England. This was on the same day as other local elections. The Liberal Democrats gained two seats from the Conservatives and one from Labour, but the Conservatives remained in an overall majority.

After the election the composition of the council was:

 Conservative: 19
 Liberal Democrats: 9
 Labour: 5
 UKIP: 1

Ward Results

Alverstoke

Anglesey

Bridgemary North

Bridgemary South

Brockhurst

Christchurch

Elson

Forton

Grange

Hardway

Lee East

Lee West

Leesland

Peel Common

Privett

Rowner and Holbrook

Town

References

2016 English local elections
2016
2010s in Hampshire